Paraeclipta is a genus of beetles in the family Cerambycidae, containing the following species:

 Paraeclipta bicoloripes (Zajciw, 1965)
 Paraeclipta cabrujai Clarke, 2011
 Paraeclipta clementecruzi Clarke, 2011
 Paraeclipta croceicornis (Gounelle, 1911)
 Paraeclipta flavipes (Melzer, 1922)
 Paraeclipta jejuna (Gounelle, 1911)
 Paraeclipta kawensis (Penaherrera-Leiva & Tavakilian, 2004)
 Paraeclipta longipennis (Fisher, 1947)
 Paraeclipta melgarae Clarke, 2011
 Paraeclipta moscosoi Clarke, 2011
 Paraeclipta rectipennis (Zajciw, 1965)
 Paraeclipta soumourouensis (Tavakilian & Penaherrera-Leiva, 2003)
 Paraeclipta tenuis (Burmeister, 1865)
 Paraeclipta tomhacketti Clarke, 2011
 Paraeclipta unicoloripes (Zajciw, 1965)

References

Rhinotragini